Absolutely the Best is a compilation album by American folk singer Odetta, originally released in 2000.

The focus of the material are the songs Odetta performed when recording for the Tradition label — 11 tracks from Odetta Sings Ballads and Blues and seven from At the Gate of Horn.

Track listing
All songs Traditional unless otherwise noted.
 "Gallows Tree (Gallows Pole)" – 2:50
 "Joshua" – 1:51
 "Chilly Winds" – 2:40
 "He's Got the Whole World in His Hands" – 1:53
 "Take This Hammer" (Huddie Ledbetter) –  3:30
 "Muleskinner Blues" (Jimmie Rodgers) – 2:51
"Another Man Done Gone" (Vera Hall, Alan Lomax, John Lomax, Ruby Pickens Tartt) – 2:09
 "The Midnight Special" – 2:34
 "Alabama Bound" (Lomax, Lomax) – 1:42
 "God's Gonna Cut You Down" – 1:48
 "Glory, Glory" – 2:10
 "Easy Rider"  (Ledbetter) – 5:04
 "Jack o' Diamonds" – 3:13
 "Shame and Scandal" – 2:20
 "'Buked and Scorned" – 2:38
 "Lowlands" – 2:36
 "Pretty Horses" – 2:59
 Spiritual Trilogy: "Oh, Freedom", "Come and Go With Me", "I'm on My Way" – 6:06

Personnel
Odetta – vocals, guitar
Bill Lee – bass
Milt Okun – choir conductor

References

2000 greatest hits albums
Odetta compilation albums